Government Degree College, Gandacherra, is a college in Gandacherra Dhalai district, Tripura. It offers undergraduate courses in arts and sciences. It is affiliated to Tripura University.

Accreditation
The college is recognized by the University Grants Commission (UGC).

See also
Education in India
Education in Tripura
Tripura University
Literacy in India
List of institutions of higher education in Tripura

References

External links

Colleges affiliated to Tripura University
Universities and colleges in Tripura
Colleges in Tripura